The 1929 Kilkenny Senior Hurling Championship was the 35th staging of the Kilkenny Senior Hurling Championship since its establishment by the Kilkenny County Board.

On 8 December 1929, Mooncoin won the championship after a 5-01 to 3-03 defeat of first-time finalists Carrickshock in a final replay at Nowlan Park. It was their ninth championship title overall while they also became the first team to win three successive championships.

Results

Finals

References

Kilkenny Senior Hurling Championship
Kilkenny Senior Hurling Championship